Frederick John Niven, (March 31, 1878 – January 30, 1944) was a Canadian novelist of Scottish heritage. A prolific author, he produced over thirty works of fiction, an autobiography, poetry, essays, and pieces of journalism.

Biography

Early life
Niven was born in Valparaiso, Chile on 31 March 1878, the youngest of three children. His father manufactured sewed muslin, while his mother was a Calvinist born in Calcutta. When he reached school age, he accompanied his mother to Scotland. He was educated at Hutcheson's Grammar School, Glasgow, where his heart trouble prevented him from swimming. First employed in his father's factory, he later worked as a librarian in Glasgow and Edinburgh, and also had employment in a jewelry shop. He attended the Glasgow School of Art during the evening for two years. On the advice of a doctor, in his late teens Niven moved to the drier climate of the Okanagan Valley in British Columbia. He worked on a railroad near Savona and dug ditches in Vancouver. When he was twenty years old, he spent a summer tramping in southern British Columbia, later portrayed in Wild Honey. His return to Scotland was aboard a cattleboat from Montreal, a setting recreated in S. S. Glory (1915).

After his arrival, he contributed western sketches to the Glasgow Weekly Herald, and later, to The Pall Mall Magazine, eventually becoming a journalist. His first novel, Lost Cabin Mine (1908), was a Western published serially in The Popular Magazine. His second, The Island of Providence (1910), a historical romance of 17th century Devon, contained scenes replete with pirates and buccaneers. His first foray into realistically depicting Scottish life was A Wilderness of Monkeys (1911). 

In 1911, Niven married Mary Pauline Thorne-Quelch, a journalist fifteen years his junior. In 1912 and 1913 the couple spent several months travelling in Western Canada prior to returning to London before WWI. Niven was rejected for military service due to his heart condition. He spent the war working for the Ministry of Food and the War Office. This period, the years 1913 to 1920, was most productive, and included the publication of Justice of the Peace (1914), which many, including his wife, consider to be his finest novel. His first volume of poetry, Maple Leaf Songs, appeared in 1917.

British Columbia

In 1920, Niven and his wife settled permanently on Willow Point, near Nelson, British Columbia, on the shores of Kootenay Lake. Starting in this decade, Niven traveled extensively, learning sign language from the Blackfoot people at Calgary, and also went farther abroad, to South America, the Yukon, and Hawaii. The year 1923 saw the publication of the Western The Wolfer, a novel Niven described as written partly for fun and partly for money. He produced articles for Canadian Magazine, The Dalhousie Review, and Saturday Night. He now solely lived by his writing. In 1927, he published Wild Honey (UK Queer Fellowes), an account of hobo life, which the writer Charles Lillard later described as one of three best early novels of British Columbia. Two years later, he put forth a pair of non-fiction books, The Story of Alexander Selkirk, and Canada West, a historical account of western Canada. One disadvantage of living in British Columbia was that his reputation in England began to decline.

The 1930s witnessed some of Niven's best Scottish novels, including The Three Marys (1930), The Paisley Shawl (1931), and the Staff at Simson's (1937). The first novel in his Canadian historical trilogy, The Flying Years, appeared in 1935. He collaborated with the artist Walter J. Phillips to produce Colour in the Canadian Rockies (1937). Niven published in 1938 a series of autobiographical essays entitled Coloured Spectacles. His trilogy continued with Mine Inheritance (1940), and the posthumously published The Transplanted (1944).

Due to repeated heart attacks, Niven first moved to Nelson, and in 1943 to Vancouver. He died there on January 10, 1944. He is buried in Nelson, British Columbia. In 1946 his headstone was provided by the City of Glasgow, and the memorial tablet by the Canadian Authors Association. The Frederick Niven Literary Award, given for outstanding contribution to literature by a Scot, is named after him.

Criticism
The Canadian literary critic Northrop Frye considered Niven to be a "writer of brilliant promise". He was reviewed favourably by Hugh Walpole, Christopher Morley, Rebecca West, and Katherine Mansfield. However, he never reached the top echelon of either Scottish or Canadian authors. His first novels were influenced by Robert Louis Stevenson and the hero of penny dreadfuls, Deadwood Dick. The quality of his works varied greatly, several being nothing more than potboilers. Niven's literary reputation rested mainly on his early novel The Justice of the Peace. His Scottish novels are thought to be superior to his Canadian ones. The critic Edward McCourt ascribed this to Niven's emigration to Canada in middle age, and imperfect assimilation of the mores of his new home.

Niven was a careful stylist, and his writing showed qualities of wit, humanity, and intelligence. His ability to write memorable poetic descriptions has been remarked upon. The plots in his Scottish novels are not well developed, relying rather on an evocation of character and atmosphere. Despite the diligent sourcing of historical data, Niven's Canadian trilogy is marred by frequently wooden characters. One noted structural defect in The Flying Years is the too rapid passage of time, making it seem episodic. The latter novel is the only one of Niven's works to be included in the New Canadian Library series.

List of works

 The Lost Cabin Mine (1908) - novel set in British Columbia
 The Island Providence (1910) - historical novel set partly in Caribbean
 A Wilderness Of Monkeys (1911) - Scottish novel
 Dead Men's Bells (1912) - Scottish & pirate novel set in 18th century
 Above Your Heads (1912) - short stories
 Hands Up! (1913) - novel set in United States
 Ellen Adair (1913) - Scottish novel
 The Porcelain Lady (1913) - Scottish novel
 Justice Of The Peace (1914 & 1923) - Scottish novel
 The SS Glory (1915) - novel set on a cattleboat from Montreal to Liverpool
 Cinderella Of Skookum Creek (1916) - novel set in western North America
 Two Generations (1916) - Scottish novel
 Sage Brush Stories (1917) - short stories
 Maple Leaf Songs (1917) - poetry
 Penny Scot's Treasure (1918) - novel set in western Canada
 The Lady Of The Crossing (1919) - novel set in British Columbia
 A Tale That Is Told (1920) - Scottish novel
 The Wolfer (1923) - novel set in western United States
 Treasure Trail (1923) - novel set in British Columbia
 A Lover Of The Land, And Other Poems (1925) - poetry
 Queer Fellows (title in US: Wild Honey) (1927) - autobiographical account set in British Columbia
 Canada West (1929 & 1930) - non-fiction account of western Canada
 The Story Of Alexander Selkirk (1929) - non-fiction
 The Three Marys (1930) - principally Scottish novel
 The Paisley Shawl (1931) - Scottish novel
 The Rich Wife (1932) - Scottish novel
 Mrs Barry (1933) - Scottish novel
 Triumph, (1934) - novel set in South America and Scotland
 The Flying Years (1935) - historical novel set in Manitoba
 Old Soldier (1936) - Scottish novel
 The Staff At Simson's (1937) - Scottish novel
 Colour In The Canadian Rockies [with Walter J. Phillips] (1937) - non-fiction
 Coloured Spectacles (1938) - autobiographical essays
 The Story Of Their Days (1939) - Scottish novel
 Mine Inheritance (1940) - historical novel set in Manitoba
 Brothers In Arms (1942) - historical novel set in 18th century Glasgow and Virginia
 Under Which King (1943) - historical novel with a Jacobite setting
 The Transplanted (1944) - historical novel set in British Columbia

 
Source:

Notes

References

External links
 Frederick Niven fonds at Glenbow Museum
 
 

1878 births
1944 deaths
20th-century Canadian novelists
People from Valparaíso
Writers from Glasgow
British expatriates in Chile
British emigrants to Canada